Timothy III (died 481), called Salophakiolos ("wobble cap"), was the patriarch of Alexandria from 460 until 475 and again from 477 until his death. He was an adherent of the Council of Chalcedon and opponent of Monophysitism. As such, he is not recognized by the Coptic Church, which considers Timothy IV to be Timothy III.

In 460 the Emperor expelled the Miaphysite Patriarch Timothy Aelurus from Alexandria and installed the Chalcedonian Timothy Salophakiolos as patriarch.

In 475, a rebellion brought about the return of Timothy Aelurus but he died only two years later in 477. The Emperor expelled his chosen successor Peter Mongus and restored Salophakiolos to his see, which he retained until his death in 481.

References

Sources
 
 

|-

|-

481 deaths
5th-century Patriarchs of Alexandria
Year of birth unknown